Nonso Temisan Ajufo known professionally as  DJ Big N is a Nigerian DJ. As part of Mavin Records, DJ Big N has supported several of the label's top-billed acts, including supporting Tiwa Savage on her first American tour. He has released several Mavin themed mixtapes, including the "Mavin All Stars" mixtape, the ‘Surulere Mixtape Volume 1’, the "ENERGY Mixtape", and several Afro session Mixtapes with “Alternate Sound” band.

Early life 

Big N was born in Lagos State to Nigerian parents and currently lives in Lagos state, Nigeria after moving back from the United Kingdom where he went to further his studies. He obtained an MBA degree from Coventry university in England. He also holds a Bsc degree in Psychology from the University of Lagos. He is the second half of a set of twins. He has a twin sister. He attended King's college Lagos and Corona primary school Victoria Island Lagos.

Career 
Dj Big N started his career in the UK playing local clubs in the West Midlands before guest playing at the Palms Club in Coventry as well as Guest playing at Club "Release". He also played for the Nigerian independence 2009 in Coventry, where he got his big break. 
Dj Big N has performed alongside acts like Kool and the Gang, Maxi Priest, Dru Hill, Billy Ocean and Joe. He also was the official DJ for the Jarule and Ashanti show which held in Lagos in October 2014. In February 2014, he was appointed as Mavin records artist, Dr. Sid official Disk Jockey. He later went on to become the official DJ for the Mavin UK tour.

In September 2014, DJ BIG N released the first ever official MAVIN mixtape. He was the official Dj for the Nigerian Centenary event that took place in Abuja in January 2014. He released the first ever MAVIN ALL STARS MIXTAPE.

DJ Big N became an active member of Mavin Records Dynasty in 2013 and plays as MAVIN Records official DJ. He was the DJ of Rema’s first America tour. After years behind turntable, he took the microphone releasing series of singles featuring star artistes including Wizkid, Don Jazzy, Kizz Daniel, Tiwa Savage and Rema.

Discography 
Erima  with Wizkid and Dr sid

My dear with Kizz Daniel and Don Jazzy 

Ogologoma with Rema

Anything with Tiwa Savage and Burna Boy 

Jowo  with Mr Eazi

Awards and nominations

See also 
List of Nigerian DJs

References

People from Lagos State
Living people
Year of birth missing (living people)
Nigerian hip hop DJs